Rabjohn is a surname. Notable people with the surname include:

 Chris Rabjohn (born 1945), British footballer
 Evie Rabjohn (born 2005), English footballer
 Stanley Rabjohn (1914–2001), American film editor